Dov M. Gabbay (born October 23, 1945) is an Israeli logician. He is Augustus De Morgan Professor Emeritus of Logic at the Group of Logic, Language and Computation, Department of Computer Science, King's College London.

Work
Gabbay has authored over four hundred and fifty research papers and over thirty research monographs. He is editor of several international journals, and of many reference works and handbooks of logic, including the Handbook of Philosophical Logic (with Franz Guenthner), the Handbook of Logic in Computer Science] (with Samson Abramsky and T. S. E. Maibaum), and the Handbook of Logic in Artificial Intelligence and Logic Programming (with C.J. Hogger and J.A. Robinson).

He is well-known for pioneering work on logic in computer science and artificial intelligence, especially the application of (executable) temporal logics in computer science, in particular formal verification, the logical foundations of non-monotonic reasoning and artificial intelligence, the introduction of fibring logics and the theory of labelled deductive systems.

He is Chairman and founder of several international conferences, executive of the European Foundation of  Logic, Language and Information and President of the International IGPL Logic Group. He is founder, and joint President of the International Federation of Computational Logic. He is also one of the four founders and council member for many years of FoLLI, the Association of Logic, Language and Information, from which he is now retired. He remains a life member.

He is co-founder with Jane Spurr of College Publications, a not-for-profit, start-up academic publisher, intended to compete with major expensive publishers at affordable prices, and not requiring copyright assignment from authors. A two volume Festschrift in his honor was published in 2005 by College Publications.

Regular positions 
 1968–1970 – Instructor, Hebrew University of Jerusalem
 1970–1973 – Assistant Professor of Philosophy, Stanford University
 1973–1975 – Associate Professor of Philosophy, Stanford University
 1975–1977 – Associate Professor, Bar-Ilan University
 1977–1983 – Lady Davis Professor of Logic, Bar-Ilan University
 1983–1998 – Professor of Computing, Imperial College of Science, Technology and Medicine, London
 1998–present – Professor of Computing, Professor of Philosophy, Augustus De Morgan Professor of Logic, King's College, London
 2009–present – Special Professor Bar-Ilan University
 2015–present – Professor of Logics, Ashkelon Academic College

Selected writings 

Samson Abramsky, Dov M. Gabbay, T.S.E. Maibaum. Handbook of Logic in Computer Science, Vols.1-5. Clarendom Press, Oxford, 1992–2000.
Artur S. d'Avila Garcez, Luis C. Lamb, Dov Gabbay. Neural-Symbolic Cognitive Reasoning. Springer, 2009. 
Michael D. Fisher, Dov M. Gabbay, Lluis Vila (eds). Handbook of temporal reasoning in artificial intelligence. Elsevier, 2005.
Dov M. Gabbay: Theoretical foundations for non-monotonic reasoning in expert systems. In: Apt K.R. (ed) Logics and Models of Concurrent Systems. NATO ASI Series (Series F: Computer and Systems Sciences), vol 13. Springer, Berlin, Heidelberg, pp. 439–457, 1985.
Dov M. Gabbay (ed). What is a logical system? Studies in Logic and Computation, Oxford University Press, 1994.
Dov M. Gabbay. Labelled Deductive Systems, vol.1. Clarendon Press, Oxford, 1996. 
 Dov M. Gabbay. Fibring Logics. Clarendon Press, Oxford, 1998. 
Dov M. Gabbay, Ian Hodkinson, Mark Reynolds: Temporal Logic: Mathematical Foundations and Computational Aspects, vol. 1. Clarendon Press, Oxford, 1994. 
Dov M. Gabbay, Agi Kurucz, Frank Wolter, Michael Zakharyaschev: Many-dimensional modal logics: theory and applications. North-Holland, 2003.
Dov M. Gabbay, Amir Pnueli, Saharon Shelah, Jonathan Stavi. On the temporal analysis of fairness. POPL'80: Proceedings of the 7th SIGPLAN-SIGACT ACM Annual Symposium on Principles of Programming Languages, January, 1980, pages 163–173, ACM Press.
Dov M. Gabbay and John Woods. Agenda Relevance: A Study in Formal Pragmatics. North-Holland, 2003.
Ruth M. Kempson, Wilfried Meyer-Viol, Dov M. Gabbay: Dynamic syntax: The flow of language understanding. Blackwell, 2000.

References

External links
 Home page

1945 births
Living people
20th-century Israeli philosophers
Academics of King's College London
British Jews
British logicians
British philosophers
Jewish philosophers
Hebrew University of Jerusalem alumni
Stanford University faculty
Academic staff of Bar-Ilan University
Academics of Imperial College London